Megalomphalus ronaldi is a species of very small sea snail, a marine gastropod mollusk in the family Vanikoridae.

Description

Distribution

References

Vanikoridae
Gastropods described in 2009